Begonia mazae is a species of flowering plant in the family Begoniaceae, native to southeastern Mexico. In its tropical forest habitat it grows in extremely dense shade.

References

mazae
Endemic flora of Mexico
Flora of Southeastern Mexico
Plants described in 1947